A trauma center is a type of hospital that cares for patients with major traumatic injuries.

Trauma Center may also refer to:

Trauma Center (TV series), a 1983 American medical drama
Trauma Center (video game series), a series of simulation and visual novel games
Trauma Center (film), a 2019 American action thriller film

See also
 Emergency department